The Steinbach Black Wings Linz are a member of the ICE Hockey League (ICEHL). They play their home games in Linz, Austria at the Keine Sorgen EisArena.

History
The EHC Black Wings Linz was founded in 1992. After several years in the Austrian minor leagues 2000 the Black Wings started in the highest league Erste Bank Eishockey Liga. In their inaugural season in 2000–01 the Black Wings reached third place in the regular season before suffering elimination in the playoffs. The season 2001–02 they just lost the finals and finished the season as vice champion. In only their third season, in 2002–03, the Black Wings won the Austrian championship, their first.

After the EHC Black Wings Linz went bankrupt in 2005 they were re-established as EHC LIWEST Black Wings Linz through sponse LIWEST. Since under the new ownership the Black Wings have had their best result to date in the championship in season 2006–07 as they became vice champion once more. One year later the Black Wings unexpectedly won the regular season but failed in the playoffs.

In 2012 the Black Wings defeated EC KAC in five games to claim their second EBEL championship in franchise history.

Honours
ICE Hockey League:
Winners (2): 2002–03, 2011–12
Runners-up (2): 2001–02, 2009–10

Players and personnel

Current roster

Updated on 23 January 2023

|}

Head coaches

Stanislav Barda, 2001–04
Kurt Harand, 2004–06
Mike Zettel, 2006
Bill Stewart, 2006
Jim Boni, 2007–09
Kim Collins, 2009–11
Rob Daum, 2011–17
Troy Ward, 2017–19
Tom Rowe, 2019–20
Pierre Beaulieu, 2020–21
Dan Ceman, 2021–22
Philipp Lukas, 2022–present

Franchise records and leaders

Single season
Goals: 38 Brian Lebler (2017–18)
Assists: 47 Corey Locke (2017–18)
Points: 72 Rob Shearer (2006–07)
Penalty Minutes: 151 Reid Simonton (2003–04)

Career
Career Goals: 198 Brian Lebler
Career Assists: 300 Philipp Lukas
Career Points: 457 Philipp Lukas
Career Penalty Minutes: 885 Philipp Lukas
Career Games: 790 Philipp Lukas

Arena data
The home arena of the Black Wings is the Linz AG Eisarena. It was built in 1986 and was renovated at least two times since that. In 2014 a new stand has been added, increasing its capacity to 4,865 people.

Average of attendances

2003–04: 3,712 visitors per home game
2004–05: 3,068 visitors per home game
2005–06: 3,125 visitors per home game
2006–07: 2,707 visitors per home game
2007–08: 2,615 visitors per home game
2008–09: 2,584 visitors per home game
2009–10: 2,676 visitors per home game
 ...
2015–16: 4,642 visitors per home game
2016–17: 4,679 visitors per home game
2017–18: 4,709 visitors per home game

Fanclubs
The club have three official fanclubs: Overtime, Powerplay Enns and bully:absolut. In 2007 they consolidated and founded the head club Wings United what makes it easier to organize trips to away games and several events.

References

External links
 Official website
 Website of fanclub Overtime

Ice hockey teams in Austria
Austrian Hockey League teams
Ice hockey clubs established in 1992
1992 establishments in Austria